Nadia B. Theodore is a Canadian diplomat. She is ambassador to the World Trade Organization.

Life 
Theodore holds a Bachelors with Honors and Masters in Political Science from Carleton University (2004), and a Bachelor of Laws from the University of London (1999).

In 2000 she began working for the Canadian Civil Service, and in 2004 she joined the Canadian Ministry of Foreign Affairs as a trade negotiator. She then held various senior positions in economic, international and social policy, including at the Canada Revenue Agency and Public Safety Canada. 
From 2009 to 2012 she worked at the Permanent Mission of Canada to the United Nations in Geneva. She served as the Canadian Consul General in Atlanta from 2017 to 2020. She then became Senior Vice President at Maple Leaf Foods; she was an adjudicator for the Arrell Global Food Innovation Award.

References 

Canadian women ambassadors
Carleton University alumni
Alumni of the University of London
Permanent Representatives to the World Trade Organization
Living people
Year of birth missing (living people)